Pixar Animation Studios has released many short films and received awards for many of them.

Luxo Jr.

Tin Toy

Knick Knack

Geri's Game

For the Birds

Mike's New Car

Boundin'''==

==Jack-Jack Attack==

==One Man Band==

==Lifted==

==Your Friend the Rat==

==Presto==

==Day & Night==

==La Luna==

==Sanjay's Super Team==

== Piper==

== Lou==

==Bao''

References

Short films
Lists of awards